Donald Gordon Addis (September 13, 1935 – November 29, 2009) was an American comic strip artist.

He received his bachelor's degree from the University of Florida, where he was in charge of the production lab for the student newspaper, The Alligator (later The Independent Florida Alligator). His work includes a self-published collection of his work at U of F, numerous freelance cartoons for Playboy magazine, and the syndicated newspaper strips:
 Briny Deep (1980–1981)
 The Great John L., also known as Babyman (1982–1985)
 Bent Offerings (1988–2004)

Addis was a longtime member of the Freedom From Religion Foundation. He received the Foundation's Freethought in the Media “Tell It Like It Is” award at the 2005 national convention in Orlando.

Addis received the National Cartoonist Society Newspaper Panel Cartoon Award for 1992 for his work on Bent Offerings.

He retired as an editorial cartoonist and columnist with the St. Petersburg Times Publishing Company in 2004, where he had worked since 1964.

Don Addis was known for creating his hugely popular "Addis rocks", particularly shaped pieces of granite with sour cartoon faces drawn on them.  He never sold them although they were in great demand. He always raffled them off for charity or gave them to people as prized gifts.

Addis died of lung cancer at the age of 74 on November 29, 2009.

References

Sources consulted 
 Strickler, Dave. Syndicated Comic Strips and Artists, 1924-1995: The Complete Index. Cambria, CA: Comics Access, 1995. .

Notes

External links
 NCS Division Awards – National Cartoonists Society 
 Don Addis editorial cartoon, St. Petersburg Times (Dec. 31, 1999)

American comic strip cartoonists
University of Florida alumni
1935 births
2009 deaths